The payada is a folk music tradition native to Argentina, Uruguay, southern Brasil, and south Paraguay as part of the Gaucho culture and literature. In Chile it is called paya and performed by huasos. It is a performance of improvised ten-line verse called décimas usually accompanied by guitar. The performer is called a "payador", albeit any guitar performer in the region is called by the same name.  In performances of two or more payadores (the "payada"), known as contrapunto, they will compete to produce the most eloquent verse, each answering questions posed by the other, often insulting. The durations of these verse duels can be exceedingly long, often many hours, and they end when one payador fails to respond immediately to his opponent. Musical styles often used in the payada are the cifra, the huella and the milonga.

History 
The work of Bartolomé Hidalgo (born in Montevideo in 1788) is considered a precedent of this form of art in the Río de la Plata. Hidalgo is regarded as the first gaucho poet. His birthdate, August 24, was established as the "Day of the Payador" in Uruguay.

In Argentina, July 23 was established as the "Day of the Payador" in commemoration of the famous payada where Juan de Nava and Gabino Ezeiza contended. This payada was held in Paysandú in 1884, and Ezeiza was proclaimed the winner with the improvisation of his famous Saludo a Paysandú. A recording of this song is the only existing record of Ezeiza's voice.

The first registered payador was Simón Méndez (nicknamed Guasquita), a soldier who fought in the British invasions of the River Plate. Both in Argentina and Uruguay, the payada is considered part of the "gauchesca" culture. Santos Vega (to whom writer Rafael Obligado dedicated his most famous poem) is considered "the" payador par excellence, with successors such as Gabino Ezeiza, José Betinoti, Carlos Molina, Abel Soria, Julio Gallego, Gabino Sosa Benítez, Cayetano Daglio, among others.

The payada has also been parodied by the comedy-musical group Les Luthiers in their Payada de la vaca.

The work of Bartolomé Hidalgo, born in Montevideo in 1788, who is considered the first gaucho poet, can be found as an antecedent to the appearance of this art in the Río de la Plata. The date of his birth (August 24) was established by law as "Payador's Day" in Uruguay.

See also

 Gaucho literature
 Olmué Festival
Martín Fierro
Santos Vega
Guitarrón chileno

References

External links

Verse contests
Spanish-language poems
Argentine styles of music
Uruguayan culture
Chilean folk music
Paraguayan styles of music
Uruguayan styles of music
Argentine poems
Argentine folklore
Uruguayan poems
Uruguayan folklore
Chilean folklore
Chilean poetry
Gaucho culture